The Boston Air Defense Sector (BADS) is an inactive United States Air Force Air Defense Command (ADC) organization.  Its last assignment was with the ADC 26th Air Division at Hancock Field, New York.

History
BADS was established in 1956 at Stewart Air Force Base (AFB), New York as the 4622nd Air Defense Wing pending completion of the new Semi Automatic Ground Environment (SAGE) Direction Center (DC-02)  and Combat Center (CC-04) which became operational 15 September 1958.  DC-02  was equipped with dual AN/FSQ-7 Computers.  Early in 1957, the wing was redesignated as the Boston Air Defense Sector.

The mission of the BADS was to provide air defense over New England initially in an area covering southern Maine, southern New Hampshire, southern Vermont, Massachusetts, northern Rhode Island and Connecticut and part of New York.   The day-to-day operations of the command were to train and maintain tactical units flying jet interceptor aircraft (North American F-86 Sabre, Northrop F-89 Scorpion, Lockheed F-94 Starfire, Convair F-102 Delta Dagger, Lockheed F-104 Starfighter) and operating radars and interceptor missiles (Boeing CIM-10 Bomarc) in a state of readiness with training missions and series of exercises with Strategic Air Command and other units simulating interceptions of incoming enemy aircraft.  From 1960 to 1962, BADS was also responsible for a squadron in Nova Scotia that controlled interceptors "manually" (by voice instructions rather than by data link).

The Otis Bomarc SAMs (26th ADMS) were directed from the Air Defense Direction Center (CC-01/DC-03) at Hancock Air Force Base, Syracuse, New York. Continental Air Defense Command, in setting up the air defence command and control system in the area, had designated the Boston Air Defense Sector as 1 of 4 sectors in the 26th Air Division "effective April 1, 1958" DC-03 was operational on December 1, 1958; and the division was the 1st operational in the SAGE Air Defense Network — 1 January 1959 (CC-01 was the "first SAGE regional battle post", beginning operations "in early 1959".)

The Sector was moved on paper to Hancock Field, New York and was eliminated on 1 April 1966 due to a general reorganization of ADC.  Most of its assigned units were reassigned  to the 34th or 35th Air Divisions.

Lineage
 Designated as the 4622d Air Defense Wing, SAGE on 1 April 1956 and organized
 Redesignated as Boston Air Defense Sector on 8 January 1957
 Discontinued and inactivated on 1 April 1966

Assignments
 Eastern Air Defense Force, 1 April 1956 - 18 October 1956
 26th Air Division, 18 October 1956 - 1 October 1966

Stations
 Stewart AFB, New York, 1 April 1956 - 1 April 1966
 Hancock Field, New York, 1 April 1966 - 1 April 1966

Components

Wings
 33d Fighter Wing (Air Defense)
 Otis AFB, Massachusetts, 8 January - 18 August 1957

Groups
 329th Fighter Group (Air Defense)
 Stewart AFB, New York, 18 October 1956 - 1 August 1959
 4729th Air Defense Group
 Westover AFB, Massachusetts, 1 July 1957 - 30 April 1958
 4735th Air Defense Group
 Otis AFB, Massachusetts, 18 August 1957 - 1 September 1959

Interceptor squadrons

 49th Fighter-Interceptor Squadron
 Laurence G. Hanscom Field, Massachusetts, 1 August 1958 - 1 July 1959; 4 September 1963-1 April 1966
 60th Fighter-Interceptor Squadron
 Otis AFB, Massachusetts, 1 August 1959 - 1 April 1966
 76th Fighter-Interceptor Squadron
 Westover AFB, Massachusetts, 1 February 1961 - 1 July 1963

 324th Fighter-Interceptor Squadron
 Westover AFB, Massachusetts, 8 October 1956 - 8 July 1957
 337th Fighter-Interceptor Squadron
 Westover AFB, Massachusetts, 18 October 1956 - 8 July 1957, 25 June 1958-8 July 1960
 465th Fighter-Interceptor Squadron
 Laurence B. Hanscom Field, Massachusetts, 1 July 1959 - 15 March 1960

Missile squadron
 26th Air Defense Missile Squadron (BOMARC)
 Otis AFB, Massachusetts, 1 March 1959 - 1 April 1966

Radar squadrons

 644th Aircraft Control and Warning Squadron
 Rye Air Force Station (AFS), New Hampshire, 18 October 1956 - 30 October 1957
 648th Aircraft Control & Warning Squadron (later 648th Radar Squadron (SAGE))
 Benton AFS, Pennsylvania,  18 October 1956 - 15 August 1958; 4 September 1963 - 1 April 1966
 654th Radar Squadron (SAGE)
 Brunswick AFS, Maine, 1 August 1962 - 25 June 1965
 655th Radar Squadron (SAGE)
 Watertown AFS, New York, 4 September 1963 - 1 April 1966
 656th Aircraft Control & Warning Squadron (later 656th Radar Squadron (SAGE))
 Saratoga Springs AFS, New York, 18 October 1956 - 1 April 1966

 672d Aircraft Control and Warning Squadron
 Barrington AS, Nova Scotia, 1 July 1960 - 1 June 1962
 762nd Aircraft Control & Warning Squadron (later 762d Radar Squadron (SAGE))
 North Truro AFS, Massachusetts, 18 October 1956 - 1 April 1966
 764th Radar Squadron (SAGE)
 Saint Albans AFS, Vermont, 1 August 1962 - 1 April 1966
 820th Radar Squadron (SAGE) (later 820th Aircraft Control & Warning Squadron)
 Fort Heath, Massachusetts, 18 October 1959 - 1 December 1962
 911th Radar Squadron (SAGE)
 Lyndonville AFS, Vermont, 1 August 1962 - 1 August 1963

Weapons Systems

 F-86D, 1957-1957
 F-86L, 1957-1960
 F-89H, 1957-1960
 F-89J, 1957-1961
 F-94C, 1957-1959

 F-101B, 1959-1966
 F-102A, 1961-1963
 F-104A, 1958-1960
 IM-99 (later CIM-10), 1959-1966

See also
 List of USAF Aerospace Defense Command General Surveillance Radar Stations
 Aerospace Defense Command Fighter Squadrons
 List of MAJCOM wings
 List of United States Air Force aircraft control and warning squadrons

References

Notes

Bibliography

 
 Radomes.org Boston  Air Defense Sector
 

Further Reading

External links
 Radomes.org Photos of Boston Air Defense Sector SAGE facilities

1956 establishments in New York (state)
1966 disestablishments in New York (state)
Aerospace Defense Command units
Air Defense
Military units and formations established in 1956
Military units and formations in New York (state)